Elnara Nadir qizi Kerimova, also spelled Karimova (born 1962 in Baku) is an Azerbaijani and Turkish conductor and chorus master.

Contributions
Born in Baku, Azerbaijan, Elnara Kerimova studied choir conducting at the Asaf Zeynally Music College and later at the Baku Academy of Music. While still receiving her professional training at the Zeynalli College she became a chorister for the Azerbaijan State Polyphonic Choir. She was promoted to chief conductor of the choir in 1988. Within the next four years, the orchestra guided by Kerimova toured Russia, Ukraine, Turkey, Estonia, Latvia, and Belarus.

In 1992, Kerimova was invited to Turkey by the Ministry of Culture to conduct the TRT Ankara Radio Polyphonic Choir. With this choir, she participated in various festivals and has given more than 300 concerts.

Starting from May 1999 Elnara Kerimova has been working as a conductor for the Orfeon Chamber Choir.

Kerimova has been entrusted important positions at various educational institutions and amateur choirs. She has taken the responsibility to develop and improve the choral music while also popularizing this genre throughout Turkey.

References

Turkish people of Azerbaijani descent
1962 births
Living people
Azerbaijani conductors (music)
Turkish conductors (music)
Musicians from Baku
21st-century conductors (music)